The European Sponsorship Association (ESA) represents those involved in sponsorship across Europe.

History

The European Sponsorship Association was formed in October 2003 by the merger of two bodies, the European Sponsorship Consultants Association and the Institute for Sports Sponsorship.

The European Sponsorship Consultants Association (ESCA) was founded in 1990. ESCA promoted the sponsorship industry across Europe including working with the European Commission to encourage the development of sponsorship across the EU. ESCA also championed a concerted attack on any issues and threats to the sponsorship business.

The Institute of Sports Sponsorship was founded in 1985, with Prince Philip as its President, to be the representative voice of the sports sponsorship industry and to encourage the growth of sponsorship for the benefit of sport. The ISS promoted best practice in sponsorship; worked closely with sports bodies, government and the media to improve understanding and skills; and lobbied on behalf of its membership on key issues. ISS members included major sponsoring companies in the UK as well as consultancies, research agencies and sports law practices. As well as representing the industry's interests regarding national sponsorship, the ISS promoted the development of sports sponsorship at grass roots and created Sportsmatch, a government funded incentive scheme matching sponsorships of grass roots sport. ISS managed Sportsmatch in England from 1992 until 2003 when ESA took over responsibility for Sportsmatch.  Responsibility for Sportsmatch was subsequently transferred to Sport England in March 2007.

Membership

ESA has 225 members drawn from 14 countries and across the range of the sponsorship industry operating at global, pan-European and national levels including:

Sponsors
Rights holders
Consultants
Suppliers
Professional advisors

ESA has affiliations and contacts with European national sponsorship bodies including Hungary and the Netherlands.

Sponsorship definition

ESA defines sponsorship using the ICC Code of Sponsorship Definition:

"Sponsorship: any commercial agreement by which a sponsor, for the mutual benefit of the sponsor and sponsored party, contractually provides financing or other support in order to establish an association between the sponsor’s image, brands or products and a sponsorship property in return for rights to promote this association and/or for the granting of certain agreed direct or indirect benefits."

Activities

The Association’s activities cover all areas of sponsorship including sport, broadcasting, media, the arts, culture and heritage, environment, charities, community. The specific activities of ESA include:

Code of Conduct
Advocacy
Annual major conference "Future Sponsorship" - the next conference will be in Brussels, 8/9 November 2007
European Sponsorship Awards
Annual surveys on sponsorship
Workshops
Education and training
Networking events
Sponsorship evaluation methodology

White papers

European Commission

ESA Position Statement on Gambling Sponsorship (16 March 2011)
ESA Rights Holder Survey: A survey of rights holders attitudes towards alcohol sponsorship (February 2009)
ESA support for the EC Charter on Alcohol and Health
Policy statement on sponsorship by alcohol brands (Sept 2006)
Ambush Marketing Policy (October 2005)
Comments on a Directive proposed by the European Commission on 18 June 2003 concerning unfair business-to-consumer commercial practices in the Internal Market ("the Directive") (October 2003)
Response to the European Commission regarding the Review of the "Television Without Frontiers" directive Discussion Document - May 2003 (June 2003)  
Response to the European Commission Commercial Communications Expert Group regarding the "Opinion Papers on Sponsorship" - February 2003 (February 2003)

UK

ESA response to 'Addiction' article on alcohol sponsorship. (November 2009)
ESA response to the Gambling Commission consultation (March 2007)
Response to Ofcom's paper dated 14 July 2004 entitled "Consultation on the proposed Broadcasting Code" (September 2004)
Response to Ofcom's consultation paper entitled "The Future Regulation of Broadcast Advertising" dated October 2003 (January 2004)

Website
http://www.sponsorship.org

See also
Sponsorship
Marketing communications
Alcohol advertising

Sports sponsorships
Marketing organizations